Charles Melville Dewey (1849–1937) was an American tonalist painter.  He was born in Lowville, New York. Confined to his bed from his twelfth to his seventeenth year by a hip disease, he formed the poetic conception of nature which appears in his pictures. He studied in the schools of the National Academy of Design, New York (1874–76), and in Paris under Carolus-Duran, whom he assisted to paint a ceiling in the Louvre.  In 1878 he returned to New York.  Dewey's work has much highly individual, poetic sentiment and generally depicts subdued morning and evening effects.  His landscapes in oil and water color are in many public galleries and private collections in the United States.  Among his best are: 
 Indian Summer and A November Evening (1904)
 Morning Bay of St.Ives and The Brook (1905)
 The Edge of the Forest (formerly Corcoran Gallery, Washington)
 The Harvest Moon and The Close of Day (National Gallery, Washington)
 The Gray Robe of Twilight (Buffalo Gallery)
 Old Fields (Pennsylvania Academy, Philadelphia)

He was made a member of the National Academy of Design in 1907.

He died at the Hotel Chelsea in Manhattan on January 17, 1937.

References

External links
Charles Melville Dewey exhibition catalogs

19th-century American painters
American male painters
20th-century American painters
People from Lowville, New York
1849 births
1937 deaths
Painters from New York City
National Academy of Design members
National Academy of Design alumni
Tonalism
19th-century American male artists
20th-century American male artists
Members of the American Academy of Arts and Letters